Randolph is an unincorporated community and coal town in Somerset County, Pennsylvania, United States. Randolph Coal Company operated a mine in Randolph in 1918.

References

Unincorporated communities in Somerset County, Pennsylvania
Coal towns in Pennsylvania
Unincorporated communities in Pennsylvania